Ethel Hudzon (born 1 February 1968) is an Indonesian former long-distance runner. He competed in the men's marathon at the 1996 Summer Olympics.

References

External links
 

1968 births
Living people
Athletes (track and field) at the 1996 Summer Olympics
Indonesian male long-distance runners
Indonesian male marathon runners
Olympic athletes of Indonesia
Place of birth missing (living people)
Indonesian male cross country runners
20th-century Indonesian people
21st-century Indonesian people